Vianden is a canton in the north of Luxembourg. Its capital is Vianden.

Administrative divisions
Vianden Canton consists of the following three communes:

 Putscheid
 Tandel
 Vianden

Mergers
 On 1 January 2006 the former commune of Bastendorf (from Diekirch Canton) was merged with the former commune of Fouhren (from Vianden Canton) to create the commune of Tandel (in Vianden Canton).  The law creating Tandel was passed on 21 December 2004.  Therefore, Vianden Canton gained 24.44 km2 of land from Diekirch Canton.

Population

References

 
Cantons of Luxembourg